Paul F. Tucker is the District Attorney of Essex County, Massachusetts. 

Tucker is a former member of the Massachusetts House of Representatives and former House Vice Chair of the Joint Committee on Marijuana Policy. A member of the Democratic Party, Tucker was first elected to the State House in 2014 to represent the 7th Essex district, which consists of Salem, Massachusetts.

Tucker formerly served as Chief of the Salem Police Department.

Massachusetts House of Representatives

In addition to serving as the House Vice Chair of the Joint Committee on Marijuana Policy, Tucker also sat on the Joint Committee on Education, Joint Committee on the Judiciary, Joint Committee on Public Safety and Homeland Security, Joint Committee on Ways and Means, and House Committee on Ways and Means.

See also
 2019–2020 Massachusetts legislature
 2021–2022 Massachusetts legislature

References

Democratic Party members of the Massachusetts House of Representatives
Politicians from Salem, Massachusetts
Living people
American municipal police chiefs
21st-century American politicians
Year of birth missing (living people)